Frederick Price (1888–1960) was an English former footballer who played at right-half for Dudley Town, Wolverhampton Wanderers, Port Vale, and Newport County.

Career
Price played for Dudley Town and Wolverhampton Wanderers. During the war he made three guest appearances for Port Vale in March and April 1917, and also guested for Sunbeam Motor Works. He joined Port Vale permanently in August 1920 and went straight into the first team. He scored his first and only goal for the club on 13 November, in a 4–0 win over Hull City at The Old Recreation Ground. He lost his first team place the next month, and was released at the end of the season with 19 Second Division appearances to his name. He moved on to Newport County.

Career statistics
Source:

References

People from Brierley Hill
English footballers
Association football midfielders
Dudley Town F.C. players
Wolverhampton Wanderers F.C. players
Port Vale F.C. wartime guest players
Port Vale F.C. players
Newport County A.F.C. players
English Football League players
1888 births
1960 deaths